The Pacific Coast Conference is an American high school sports league in Orange County, California and is affiliated with CIF Southern Section. The schools are located in South and Central Orange County, California.

History
In 2019, Dana Hills High School and Laguna Hills High School announced their re-league. After votes failed, the two schools re-leagued into the PCL conference, joining baseball and wrestling powerhouses Beckman and Irvine High Schools. The PCL became an 8 team conference for the first time in 2019.

Sage Hill School joined the Pacific Coast Conference in the 2022-2023 academic year.

Schools
Arnold O. Beckman High School Patriots
Dana Hills High School Dolphins (Football only)
Irvine High School Vaqueros
Laguna Hills High School Hawks
Northwood High School Timberwolves
Portola High School Bulldogs
Sage Hill School Lightning
University High School Trojans
Woodbridge High School Warriors

Football
The Pacific Coast Conference is split into two leagues for football.

Pacific Coast League
Dana Hills High School
Irvine High School
Laguna Hills High School
Northwood High School
Sage Hill School

Pacific Hills League
Arnold O. Beckman High School
Portola High School
University High School
Woodbridge High School

References

External links
Standings for PCL high school teams

CIF Southern Section leagues
Sports in Orange County, California